WYTT is a Mainstream Urban formatted broadcast radio station licensed to Emporia, Virginia, serving Emporia and Greensville County, Virginia.  WYTT is owned and operated by John Byrne, through licensee Byrne Acquisition Group, LLC.

History
WYTT signed on in 2002 and changed calls to WLGQ the following year.  It returned to the WYTT calls in 2005.

Ownership
In June 2003, then-WLGQ was sold to First Media by MainQuad Communications Inc. as part of a nine station deal with a total sale price of $11.35 million.

Effective December 20, 2019, Byrne Acquisition Group acquired WYTT, six sister stations, and two translators from First Media for $3.4 million.

References

External links
 99.5 Jamz Online
 

YTT
Radio stations established in 2003
Mainstream urban radio stations in the United States